During his career, W. H. Weeks designed hundreds of buildings throughout California, as well as some in Oregon and Nevada. This is a list of some of the buildings that he designed.

Citations

References 

Weeks
Weeks
Weeks